Lumphumlo Kaka Sifumba (born 12 July 2005) is a South African soccer player currently playing as a midfielder for Cape Town City.

Club career

Early career
Born in Philippi, Western Cape, Sifumba left local side Flamingo FC when still in primary school, travelling to Cape Town to play in the Youth City football academy. Due to issues with his registration, he was unable to sign an academy contract with any club, so moved to Delft at the age of ten to play for Delft Spurs. He stayed at Delft Spurs for two years, before trialling with other sides.

Cape Town City
He went on trial with Cape Town City when he was fourteen, going on to sign with the club. He made history in May 2021, when he became the youngest player to feature in the Diski Rewired competition - the country's reserve league.

In January 2022, he represented Coastal United in the DStv Compact Cup, scoring a long-range goal against Dinaledi. In June of the same year, he became the first South African to sign with entertainment agency Roc Nation. In September of the same year, he was named by English newspaper The Guardian as one of the best players born in 2005 worldwide.

References

External links
 

2005 births
Living people
South African soccer players
Association football midfielders
Cape Town City F.C. (2016) players